Arıklı can refer to:

 Arıklı, Ayvacık
 Arıklı, Lice
 Arıklı, Tarsus